Andrey Valeryevich Zadorozhniy (born 3 September 1973) is a Russian middle-distance runner who specializes in the 1500 metres. His sole major international medal was a bronze at the  1998 European Indoor Championships. He won five national titles in the 1500 m at the Russian Athletics Championships, between 1997 and 2002, and four national titles indoors, including had a 1500 m/3000 metres double at the 2003 Russian Indoor Athletics Championships.

Amongst his other international placings were fifth at the 1998 Goodwill Games, seventh at the 2003 IAAF World Indoor Championships, and eighth place at the 1995 Summer Universiade, and the 1996 and 2002 European Indoor Championships. He represented his country at the 1997 World Championships in Athletics and competed in the qualifying rounds at the 1998 European Athletics Championships and 1999 IAAF World Indoor Championships.

His personal best time is 3:36.68 minutes, achieved on 20 June 1998 in Lisbon. He made his last competitive appearance in 2012.

International competitions

National titles
Russian Athletics Championships
1500 m: 1997, 1998, 1999, 2001, 2002
Russian Indoor Athletics Championships
1500 m: 1998, 1999, 2003
3000 m: 2003

Personal bests
800 metres – 1:47.32 min (2003)
1500 metres – 3:36.68 min (1998)
Mile run – 3:55.66 min (1998)
2000 metres – 5:09.21 min (2002)
3000 metres – 7:55.91 min (2001)
5000 metres – 13:48.31 min (2001)
All info from World Athletics profile

See also
List of European Athletics Indoor Championships medalists (men)
List of people from Yaroslavl

References

1973 births
Living people
Sportspeople from Yaroslavl
Russian male middle-distance runners
World Athletics Championships athletes for Russia
Russian Athletics Championships winners